Galt is an unincorporated community in Whiteside County, Illinois, United States.

Demographics

History
The community was named for John Galt, an early landowner.

References

Unincorporated communities in Whiteside County, Illinois
Unincorporated communities in Illinois